Kamena Gora is a village in the municipality of Prijepolje, Serbia. According to the 2002 census, the village has a population of 210 people. It lies on the altitude between 800 and 1500 m on the eponymous mountain.

References

External links
Kamena gora.com, Website of Kamena gora

Populated places in Zlatibor District
Prijepolje